Tisjiic, is a town in the Bari region of northeastern Somalia, located  southeast of Bosaso,  off the main road connecting Bosaso and Galkayo (locally known as Laamiga). The town consists of two parts, Upper Tisjiic and Lower Tisjiic,  approximately three kilometers away from each other.

Education
Tisjiic had two primary and intermediate schools and schools which teach Koran. In 2019 students in the area sat centralized exams that conducted by Puntland Ministry of Education. The town has rapidly growing education manners centered in the efforts of parents, community and other elite groups originally hail from the area.

History
Tisjiic was first settled in 1920. The town was primarily water stream spot where pastoralists in the area take water. Tisjiic is growing town with a significant population live the town and surrounding places.

External links
 Tisjiic, Gobolka Bari

References

Populated places in Bari, Somalia